Fengzhou or Feng Prefecture was a zhou (prefecture) in imperial China, centering on modern Fengkai County, Guangdong, China. It was created in 590 by the Sui dynasty and existed (intermittently) until 1369 during the Ming dynasty.

Geography
The administrative region of Fengzhou in the Tang dynasty is in the border area of modern western Guangdong and eastern Guangxi. It probably includes parts of modern: 
Under the administration of Zhaoqing, Guangdong:
Fengkai County
Under the administration of Yunfu, Guangdong:
Yunan County
Under the administration of Wuzhou, Guangxi:
Wuzhou
Cangwu County

References
 

Prefectures of the Sui dynasty
Prefectures of the Tang dynasty
Prefectures of Southern Han
Guangnan East Circuit
Prefectures of the Yuan dynasty
Prefectures of the Ming dynasty
Former prefectures in Guangdong
Former prefectures in Guangxi